Sentimental, the adjectival form of sentimentality, may also refer to:

Films 
 Sentimental (film), a 1981 Argentine film
 Sentimental, a 2020 Spanish comedy film also known as The People Upstairs

Music

Albums 
 Sentimental (Julio Iglesias album), 1980
 Sentimental (Tanita Tikaram album), 2005

Songs

 "Sentimental" (Kenny G composition), 1992
 "Sentimental" (Deborah Cox song) 1996
 Sentimental (Los Hermanos song), 2001
 "Sentimental" (Porcupine Tree song), 2007
 "Sentimental" (ja) by Hiromi Iwasaki, 1975
 "Sentimental", song by B. Raleigh & S. Edwards, sung by The Four Voices	1957 	, also sung by The King Sisters	1957
 "Sentimental", song by Joe Loss And His Orchestra   Foley	1957
 "Sentimental", song by Leiber and Stoller, sung by Johnny Hallyday	1961
 "Sentimental", song by Swing And Sway With Sammy Kaye Zeller & Hoffmann
 "Sentimental", song by Altered Images Happy Birthday (Altered Images album)	1981
 "Sentimental", song by Cry Before Dawn	1987
 "Sentimental", song by Kym Marsh from Standing Tall
 "Sentimental", by Feeder from Renegades
 Sentimental (Edgar Sandoval Jr. and Emilee song), 2019 song

See also
 Sentimental novel, a genre of novels
 Sentimentality
 Sentimentalism (philosophy)
 Sentimentalism (literature)